Grove Park Cemetery is a cemetery in Chinbrook, Grove Park in the London Borough of Lewisham, that opened in 1935.

Location
It is located near Grove Park on Marvels Lane, between Chinbrook Meadows and Marvels Wood, SE12.

Special interest
Grove Park Cemetery was listed by English Heritage in November 2003 as a landscape of special historic interest (Grade II). The park has a special carefully planned lay out, specific for the 1930s. It contains 56 Commonwealth service war graves of World War II; those whose graves are not marked by headstones are listed on a Screen Wall memorial in the war graves plot in the centre of the cemetery.

References

External links 
 Grove Park Cemetery at geograph.org.uk
 Lewisham council contact page for Grove Park Cemetery
 English Heritage, The Register of Parks and Gardens: Cemeteries
 

Cemeteries in London
Parks and open spaces in the London Borough of Lewisham
Religion in the London Borough of Lewisham
Grove Park, Lewisham